Sounds of Salvation is the first album by Cassino, released on March 29, 2007. It was recorded, produced and released all entirely by the band with no support from a record company.

Track listing
All songs written by Cassino
All lyrics written by Nick Torres

"Governor"
"The Old Year"
"American Low"
"New Jerusalem"
"Tin Man's Throne"
"Platano"
"Dust Went Flying"
"The Gin War"
"Lolita"
"Boomerang"
"Ice Factory"

Personnel
Nick Torres: vocals, guitar, piano, organ, bass guitar, Votpe
Tyler Odom: guitar, organ, piano, Rhodes piano, autoharp, Votpe
Garry Tallent: bass guitar
Craig Krampf: drums, percussion
Richard McLaurin: mandolin, lap steel guitar, pedal steel guitar
Elliot Chance Fountain: Rhodes piano
Jim Horn: saxophone
John Henche: trombone
Tom Odom: trumpet
Alan Torres: piano
Bill Cuomo: Wurlitzer

References 

2007 debut albums
Cassino (band) albums